Amritsar Attari Passenger is a passenger Train of Indian Railways, which runs between Amritsar railway station of Punjab and Atari Shyam Singh railway station of Punjab.

Arrival and departure
 Train no.79312 departs from Amritsar, daily at 18:20, reaching Attari the same day at 19:00.
 Train no.79311 departs from Attari daily at 08:20. from platform no.1 reaching Amritsar the same day at 09:05.

Route and halts

Average speed and frequency
The train runs with an average speed of 32 km/h and completes 24 km in 45 minutes. The train runs on a daily basis.

References

External links 
 74662/Attari Amritsar DEMU India Rail Info

Transport in Amritsar
Railway services introduced in 2015
Rail transport in Punjab, India
Diesel–electric multiple units of India